Košarkarski klub Hrastnik is a Slovenian basketball team based in the town of Hrastnik. The club was founded in 1950. The team is competing in the Slovenian Third League. Their home arena is Hrastnik Sports Hall.

References

External links
Official website 

Basketball teams established in 1950
Basketball teams in Slovenia
1950 establishments in Slovenia